MSFS may refer to:

 Master of Science in Financial Services, a graduate degree for the financial services industry offered by some institutions. One such degree is awarded since 1927 by the American College of Financial Services in Bryn Mawr, PA.
 Master of Science in Foreign Service, a graduate degree in international affairs awarded since 1922 by the Edmund A. Walsh School of Foreign Service at Georgetown University, Washington, D.C.
 Master of Science in Forensic Science, a graduate degree in criminology awarded by a number of universities. One such degree is awarded by the John Jay College of Criminal Justice at City University of New York (CUNY).
  Master of Science in Financial Management and Information Systems, an executive graduate degree preparing mid-career professionals for the role of CIO/CFO. One such degree is awarded by the University of Maryland University College (UMUC).
 Microsoft Flight Simulator, a series of flight simulator video games.
Microsoft Flight Simulator, the 2020 edition of the series.
 Missionaries of St. Francis de Sales, a Catholic religious group founded in response to the desire of St. Francis de Sales to found a society of missionary priests.